The American Legion Hall in McGill, Nevada, United States, was built by the Nevada Consolidated Copper Company circa 1918 as accommodations for single women working at the company's employee boarding house. In 1925 the building was moved to its present location to serve as housing for single male salaried employees.

The company gave the building to the American Legion in 1932. The original building plan of the one story balloon frame building had a central hall with bedrooms on either side. The Legion removed the interior partitions, inserting tie rods to keep the walls from spreading. Toilets and a kitchen were placed at one end, along with a small meeting room with a stone fireplace, while the remainder of the space was left open as a social hall.

The American Legion Hall functioned as a significant center of civic activity in McGill. It was placed on the National Register of Historic Places in 1994.

See also
National Register of Historic Places listings in White Pine County, Nevada

References

American Legion buildings
Buildings and structures in White Pine County, Nevada
History of White Pine County, Nevada
Clubhouses on the National Register of Historic Places in Nevada
American Craftsman architecture in Nevada
Bungalow architecture in Nevada
National Register of Historic Places in White Pine County, Nevada